Donat Sergeyevich Dzhatiyev (born 7 May 1992) is a Russian former professional football player.

Club career
He made his Russian Football National League debut for FC Baltika Kaliningrad on 16 July 2012 in a game against FC Volgar Astrakhan.

External links
 
 

1992 births
People from Pyatigorsk
Living people
Russian footballers
Association football forwards
FC Baltika Kaliningrad players
FC Mashuk-KMV Pyatigorsk players
Sportspeople from Stavropol Krai